The 2011 British Formula Ford Championship (an entry level single seater motor sport category), was the 36th edition of the British Formula Ford Championship. It commenced on 9 April at the Silverstone National Circuit and ended on 9 October at Silverstone Arena Circuit after 8 rounds and 24 races, all held in the United Kingdom and the Netherlands.

Drivers and teams

Race calendar and results

Championship standings
In the Championship Class, points were awarded on a 30-27-24-22-20-18-16-14-12-10-8-6-4-3-2 basis to the top fifteen classified drivers, with one point awarded to all other finishers. In the Scholarship Class, points were awarded 30-27-24-22-20-18-16-14-12-10-8-6-4-2-1 basis. An additional point was given to the driver who set the fastest lap in each race, in both classes.

Drivers' Championships

Constructors

Teams

Nations Cup

References

External links
 The home of the British Formula Ford Championship

British Formula Ford Championship seasons
Formula Ford
British Formula Ford